The  Washington Redskins season was the franchise's 14th season in the National Football League (NFL) and their 8th in Washington, D.C.  The team improved on their 6–3–1 record from 1944.  They won the Eastern division title with an 8–2 record but lost the NFL championship game to the Cleveland Rams, 15–14.

It was the Redskins' last postseason appearance for over a quarter-century, until 1971.

Schedule

Playoffs

Standings

Washington
Washington Redskins seasons
Washington